Valdiviana is a genus of true crane fly.

Distribution
Argentina, Chile.

Species
V. edwardsina Alexander, 1929
V. shannonina Alexander, 1929
V. synempora Alexander, 1929

References

Tipulidae
Diptera of South America